The 1912 Detroit Heralds season was the eighth season of independent American football played by the Detroit Heralds. The team was coached by Bill Marshall, compiled a 4–2–1 record, and won the second annual Detroit football championship with victories over the Myrtles, Morrells, and Wolverines.

The team lost to the Ann Arbor Independents, a team led by John Maulbetsch who went on to play for Michigan from 1914 to 1916 and was selected as an All-American. In their only game against an out-of-state opponent, the Heralds played the Cleveland Erin Braus to a 7–7 tie. They also lost their only game with a college squad, the Adrian Bulldogs.

The team's lineup included Birtie Maher and R. Shields (ends), Polly La Grue (quarterback), Sylvester "Ole" Mauer and Schaffer (halfbacks), Lawrence Nedeau (fullback), and Moran (center).

Schedule

Players
The team's players included the following, those players with at least four starts shown in bold:

 Beveridge - started 4 games at guard
 Fair - started 2 games at tackle
 Jueckle/Jackle - started 5 games at tackle
 Jones - started 3 games at guard
 La Grue - started all 7 games at quarterback; also team captain
 Birtie Maher - started 6 games at end, 1 game at halfback
 Martz - started 2 games at guard
 Mauer - started 6 games at halfback, 1 game at fullback
 Moran - started all 7 games at center
 Lawrence Nedeau - started 6 games at fullback
 Nichols - started 5 games at tackle, 1 game at end
 Schaffer - started 6 games at halfback, 1 game at fullback
 G. Shields - started 5 games at guard, 2 games at tackle
 R. "Dick" Shields - started 6 games at end
 Sullivan - started 1 game at end

References 

Detroit Heralds seasons
Detroit Heralds